The Last Man Who Knew Everything (2006), written by Andrew Robinson, is a biography of the British polymath Thomas Young (1773–1829).

This biography is subtitled Thomas Young, the Anonymous Polymath Who Proved Newton Wrong, Explained How We See, Cured the Sick, and Deciphered the Rosetta Stone, Among Other Feats of Genius, which gives a very brief idea of Young's polymathic career. It is divided into an introduction followed by 16 chapters describing Young's life and work in approximate chronological order.  Particular emphasis is given to Young's achievements in physics (e.g., Young's interference experiment), mathematics, physiology, medicine (e.g., Young's rule), linguistics, and Egyptology.

The book was published in hardback by Pi Press in the United States and by Oneworld Publications in the United Kingdom. It subsequently appeared in paperback editions. It has been featured on the BBC.

The book has been reviewed in a number of publications, including The Guardian,
The Independent,
The Lancet,
Publishers Weekly,
The Spectator,
and The Telegraph. PD Smith, writing for the Guardian, praised Robinson for taking on the challenge of researching such a polymath's life and calls the book "an excellent introduction to one of the most versatile minds of the 19th century".

References

External links
Amazon USA information
Amazon UK information
Book on the Internet Archive

2006 non-fiction books
21st-century history books
British biographies
Books about scientists
Books about physicians
Oneworld Publications books